Jaime Oliver (1 August 1927 – 1998) was a Spanish boxer. He competed in the men's middleweight event at the 1948 Summer Olympics.

References

1927 births
1998 deaths
Spanish male boxers
Olympic boxers of Spain
Boxers at the 1948 Summer Olympics
Sportspeople from Mallorca
Middleweight boxers